The 1998 Arizona State Sun Devils football team represented Arizona State University during the 1998 NCAA Division I-A football season. The team's head coach was Bruce Snyder, who was coaching his seventh season with the Sun Devils and 19th season overall. Home games were played at Sun Devil Stadium in Tempe, Arizona. They participated as members of the Pacific-10 Conference.

Schedule

Rankings

Personnel

Season summary

Washington

References

Arizona State
Arizona State Sun Devils football seasons
Arizona State Sun Devils football